The , or the  Pending Bridge is a  dual carriageway toll bridge and controlled-access highway in the state of Sarawak, Malaysia. The bridge is located at Pending, a district in Kuching. It is span across the Sarawak River.

The bridge were named after Tun Abang Muhammad Salahuddin Abang Barieng, the Yang di-Pertua Negeri of Sarawak from 1977 to 1991 and from 2001 to 2014.

History
Tun Salahuddin Bridge was the first only toll expressway in East Malaysia, with collection commenced on October 2003. However, the toll collection of Tun Salahuddin Bridge were abolished in 1 January 2016 by the Sarawak state government. The dismantling of the toll structures was done a month later.

References

Bridges in Sarawak
Toll bridges in Malaysia